{{DISPLAYTITLE:C7H13N}}
The molecular formula C7H13N (molar mass: 111.18 g/mol, exact mass: 111.1048 u) may refer to:

 Pyrrolizidine
 Quinuclidine

Molecular formulas